Severiano Irala Núñez (died 12 March 2012) was a Paraguayan footballer who played as a forward. He represented Cerro Porteño and Club Olimpia in his native country, Greek club Panathinaikos, and Mexican side Deportivo Toluca. He also played for the Paraguay national team from 1968 to 1972, making seven appearances and scoring three goals.

Career
Nicknamed "El Taladro" (English: "the drill") for his ability to pierce defences, Irala won the Paraguayan Primera División with Cerro Porteño in 1970, 1972, 1973, and 1974.

Death 
Irala died on 12 March 2012.

Honours 
Cerro Porteño
 Paraguayan Primera División: 1970, 1972, 1973, and 1974

References 

2012 deaths
Paraguayan footballers
Association football forwards
Paraguay international footballers
Paraguayan Primera División players
Cerro Porteño players
Club Olimpia footballers
Panathinaikos F.C. players
Deportivo Toluca F.C. players
Paraguayan expatriate footballers
Paraguayan expatriate sportspeople in Greece
Expatriate footballers in Greece
Paraguayan expatriate sportspeople in Mexico
Expatriate footballers in Mexico